Law & Order is an American police procedural and legal drama series that premiered on NBC on September 13, 1990. Set in New York City, where episodes were also filmed, the series ran for twenty seasons before it was cancelled on May 14, 2010, and aired its final episode ten days later on May 24. After its cancellation, AMC Network considered reviving Law & Order for a twenty-first season; however, in July 2010, Dick Wolf indicated that attempts had failed and he declared that the series had now "moved to the history books". The series was ultimately revived for a 21st season in February 2022. In May 2022, the series was renewed for a twenty-second season.

As of February 23, 2023, a total of 481 original episodes and one TV film of Law & Order have aired.

Series overview

Episodes

Season 1 (1990–91)

The sixth episode "Everybody's Favorite Bagman" was the original pilot made by CBS in 1988. NBC decided to air "Prescription for Death" as the first episode of the series in 1990, before airing the original pilot later in the season.
 It marks the only release of George Dzundza who left the cast at the end of the first season. He was replaced by Paul Sorvino.
 S. Epatha Merkerson guest-stars as Denise Winters in the episode "Mushrooms". She then joins the main cast as Anita Van Buren three seasons later.
13 episodes (excluding the CBS pilot) were filmed from the spring to the summer of 1990 before being broadcast. 13 episodes were already in can when the show premiered on NBC.

Season 2 (1991–92)

 Paul Sorvino joined the cast as Phil Cerreta.
The episode "The Wages of Love" guest-starred Jerry Orbach as a defense attorney. He became Mike Logan's new partner the next season as wisecracking detective Lennie Briscoe.

Season 3 (1992–93)

 Paul Sorvino (Phil Cerreta) left the cast after the episode "Point of View". He was replaced by Jerry Orbach (Lennie Briscoe) who came in during that episode. 
 Carolyn McCormick joined the cast as Dr. Elizabeth Olivet
 Dann Florek (Don Cragen) and Richard Brooks (Paul Robinette) left the cast after the episode "Benevolence;" they both returned in guest roles. Florek was replaced by S. Epatha Merkerson (Anita Van Buren), and Brooks was replaced by Jill Hennessy (Claire Kincaid).

Season 4 (1993–94)

 S. Epatha Merkerson (Anita Van Buren) and Jill Hennessy (Claire Kincaid) joined the cast.
 Carolyn McCormick (Elizabeth Olivet) and Michael Moriarty (Benjamin Stone) left the cast at the end of the season. Moriarty was replaced by Sam Waterston (Jack McCoy) in season 5.
This season the opening sequence changed to a shorter version with more bass which applies to the rest of the season.
Beginning with this season, Florek directed several episodes before joining the cast of its 1999 spin-off, Law & Order: Special Victims Unit.

Season 5 (1994–95)

 Sam Waterston (Jack McCoy) joined the cast. Dann Florek reprises his role as Donald Cragen in the episode "Bad Faith".
 This is the first season to feature 23 episodes.
 This was Chris Noth’s final season as a member of the regular cast, as Mike Logan; later, he reprised this role in the TV movie Exiled: A Law & Order Movie (1998), and on the series' second spin-off, Law & Order: Criminal Intent, from 2005 to 2008. (In season 6, Benjamin Bratt (Rey Curtis) figured similarly in the cast.)

Season 6 (1995–96)

 Benjamin Bratt (Rey Curtis) joined the cast; Richard Brooks reprises his role as former ADA Paul Robinette; and Jill Hennessy (Claire Kincaid) left the cast at the end of the season.
The season finale episode "Aftershock" was the first and only episode of the entire Law & Order series not to feature a case and instead focus on the characters' private lives.

Season 7 (1996–97)

 Carey Lowell joined the cast as Jamie Ross, replacing Jill Hennessy (Claire Kincaid) from the previous season.
 The three-part episode "D-Girl", "Turnaround," and "Showtime" guest-starred Scott Cohen, who went on to become DA Investigator Det. Chris Ravell in the spinoff Trial by Jury.

Season 8 (1997–98)

This was the first of five seasons in the series that had an unchanged cast from the previous season.
This is the first season to feature 24 episodes.
This is the final season to feature Carey Lowell in the main cast as Jamie Ross. She made a guest appearance in an episode in the next two seasons, as well as becoming a judge on the series' third spin-off, Law & Order: Trial by Jury.

Season 9 (1998–99)

 Angie Harmon joins the cast as Abbie Carmichael in this season. Benjamin Bratt (Rey Curtis) leaves the cast after this season but returns in the twentieth-season episode "Fed".
 Exiled: A Law & Order Movie was broadcast during this season.

Season 10 (1999–2000)

 Benjamin Bratt (Rey Curtis) left the cast at the end of the ninth season, and was replaced by Jesse L. Martin (Ed Green) this season. Steven Hill (Adam Schiff) left the cast at the end of the season; he was the last first-season cast member to leave the series.
This was also the season that aired with the creation of the series’ first spin-off Law & Order: Special Victims Unit.

Season 11 (2000–01)

 Dianne Wiest joins the cast as Nora Lewin in this season and Angie Harmon (Abbie Carmichael) leaves the series at the end of this season.
This is the first season not to premiere in September.

Season 12 (2001–02)

 Elisabeth Röhm joined the cast as Serena Southerlyn (character named after Dick Wolf’s daughter). Dianne Wiest (Nora Lewin) left the cast at the end of the season.
In the aftermath of 9/11, the main title voiceover by Steven Zirnkilton was changed for the first few episodes to include the following dedication: "On September 11, 2001, New York City was ruthlessly and criminally attacked. While no tribute can ever heal the pain of that day, the producers of Law & Order dedicate this season to the victims & their families and to the firefighters & police officers who remind us with their lives & courage what it truly means to be an American".
This voiceover was also heard at the beginning of Law & Order: Special Victims Unit and Law & Order: Criminal Intent, whose series premiere was suitably altered to reflect the events; the latter became L&O’s second spin-off.

Season 13 (2002–03)

 Dianne Wiest (Nora Lewin) was replaced by Fred Dalton Thompson (Arthur Branch) this season.
 This is the second season not to premiere in September.
"Absentia" was the first episode in the series to have more than 1 director listed.
With the October 9, 2002 telecast of its 279th episode, "Shangri-La," Law & Order surpassed the original Hawaii Five-O as TV's longest-running crime drama in prime-time, breaking a record that stood for 22 years.

Season 14 (2003–04)

 This is the second of five seasons in the series that had an unchanged cast from the previous season.
 Jerry Orbach (Lennie Briscoe) left the cast at the end of the season. The character Lennie Briscoe retired from the 27th Precinct and was transferred to the series' third spin-off, Law & Order: Trial by Jury, which premiered with L&O next season.

Season 15 (2004–05)
 
 Dennis Farina joined the cast as Joe Fontana this season.
 Elisabeth Röhm (Serena Southerlyn) left the cast midway through the season; in the episode "Ain't No Love" she was replaced by Annie Parisse as Alexandra Borgia in the episode "Fluency".
 Michael Imperioli temporarily replaced Jesse L. Martin (Ed Green) in the last four episodes as Nick Falco while Martin was filming Rent.
The series' third spin-off was created, Law & Order: Trial by Jury this season. It featured Jerry Orbach reprising his role as Lennie Briscoe, before his death in 2004.
This was the final season to have 24 episodes.

Season 16 (2005–06)
 
This is the third season that had an unchanged cast in between seasons, as every principal cast member who finished season 15 returned.
This is Annie Parisse's first full season in the role of ADA Alexandra Borgia. She joined the cast in the 14th episode of the previous season. In the season finale episode 'Invaders', ADA Alexandra Borgia is brutally murdered. Annie Parisse wanted out of her contract, so she quit the show.
Parisse and Dennis Farina (Joe Fontana) leave the cast after the season finale.
 Michael Imperioli (Nick Falco) reprises his role in the episode "Hindsight".
Law & Order: Trial by Jury was canceled by the end of the 2005–06 season, only lasting one season. The real-life death of Jerry Orbach had done irreparable damage to the series.

Season 17 (2006–07)
 
 Alana de la Garza (Connie Rubirosa) and Milena Govich (Nina Cassady) joined the cast.
 Fred Dalton Thompson (Arthur Branch) and Milena Govich left the cast after the season finale.  Thompson left the show to focus on his upcoming 2008 presidential bid.  In the coming season, Waterson's character (McCoy) succeeded Branch to become District Attorney.  Govich was replaced by Jeremy Sisto (who guest stars as a defense lawyer in the episode "The Family Hour") who joined the cast as Cyrus Lupo in the next season.

Season 18 (2008)

 Jeremy Sisto (Cyrus Lupo) and Linus Roache (Michael Cutter) joined the cast.
 Jesse L. Martin (Ed Green) left the cast and was replaced by Anthony Anderson (Kevin Bernard) in the episode "Burn Card".
 This is the first season to feature 18 episodes
 This was also the shortest season in the initial run of the show and the first to air mid season until the show's revival with Season 21.
 Production of the eighteenth season was interrupted by the 2007 Writers Guild of America strike when executive producer René Balcer and the rest of the writing staff participated in the work stoppage, making this season the first to start in January and also caused its original twenty-two episode order to be reduced to eighteen.

Season 19 (2008–09)

This was the fourth season that had an unchanged cast from the end of the previous season, and it was the first season to start in November.
During this season, Law & Order: UK made its debut in the United Kingdom on ITV1.

Season 20 (2009–10)

This was the fifth (and final) season in which the series had an unchanged cast from the previous season.
 Benjamin Bratt (Rey Curtis) reprised his role in the episode "Fed".
Prior to the show's cancellation, S. Epatha Merkerson (Anita Van Buren) announced she was leaving the cast in the season finale after playing her character for sixteen years, the 20th season being her 17th season.

Season 21 (2022)

This season has returned where Jeffrey Donovan, Camryn Manheim, Hugh Dancy and Odelya Halevi joined the cast during its revival after its cancellation on May 24, 2010. 
Anthony Anderson and Sam Waterston are the only returning actors from the previous seasons to return. Anderson left the show at the end of the season, deciding not to renew his contract.

Season 22 (2022–23)

Mehcad Brooks joins the main cast as Detective Jalen Shaw, following the departure of Anthony Anderson.

Home video releases

See also
 List of Law & Order home video releases
 List of Law & Order: Special Victims Unit episodes
 List of Law & Order: Criminal Intent episodes
 List of Law & Order: Trial by Jury episodes
 List of Law & Order: LA episodes

References

 Episode guide from NBC.com

Law & Order (franchise)
Law and Order